The Curtiss-Wright VZ-7 (also known as the VZ-7AP) was a VTOL quadrotor helicopter aircraft designed by the Curtiss-Wright company for the US Army. Like the Chrysler VZ-6 and the VZ-8 Airgeep it was to be a "flying jeep".

Design and development
The Aerophysics Development Corporation, a subsidiary of Curtiss-Wright, designed an "Aerial Platform" for a US Army Transport and Research Command "Flying Jeep" design competition. The Aerophysics design sat two in tandem between four ducted fan rotors and could also be armed with machine-guns or recoil-less rifles.

To prove the design concept the US Army ordered two prototypes of a smaller single-seat demonstrator, the VZ-7, which were delivered to the US Army in mid-1958. The VZ-7 had a fuselage with the pilot's seat, fuel tanks and flight controls. On both sides of the fuselage the four propeller/rotors were attached, unshrouded (the aircraft did originally have shrouds, but these were later removed). The VZ-7 was controlled by changing the thrust of each propeller and was maneuverable and easy to fly.

Operational history
The aircraft performed well during tests, but was not able to meet the Army's standards, therefore it was retired and returned to the manufacturer in 1960.

One VZ-7 is part of the United States Army Aviation Museum aircraft collection at Fort Rucker. However, it is not currently on public display due to space restrictions.

Specifications

See also

References

External links

https://web.archive.org/web/20111024155224/http://www.vectorsite.net/avplatfm.html

1950s United States military utility aircraft
VZ-7
Experimental helicopters
Quadrotors
1950s United States helicopters
Aircraft first flown in 1958
Single-turbine helicopters